Problepsis digammata is a moth of the  family Geometridae. It is found in Ethiopia, Kenya, Sierra Leone, South Africa, Tanzania and Uganda.

References

Moths described in 1896
Scopulini
Moths of Africa